The Roman Catholic Diocese of Pasto is a diocese located in the city of Pasto in the Ecclesiastical province of Popayán in Colombia.

History
10 April 1859: Established as Diocese of Pasto from the Diocese of Popayán

Ordinaries
José Elías Puyana † (15 Apr 1859 – 20 Nov 1864) Died
Juan Manuel García Tejada † (6 Jan 1866 – 23 Oct 1869) Died
Manuel Canuto Restrepo † (21 Mar 1870 – 1881) Resigned
Ignacio León Velasco, S.J. † (15 Mar 1883 – 27 May 1889) Appointed, Archbishop of Santafé en Nueva Granada
Joaquín Pardo y Vergara † (4 Jun 1891 – 1 Feb 1892) Appointed, Bishop of Medellín
Manuel José Caicedo Martínez † (1 Feb 1892 – 2 Dec 1895) Appointed, Bishop of Popayán
St. Ezequiel Moreno y Díaz, O.A.R. † (2 Dec 1895 – 19 Aug 1906) Died
Adolfo Perea † (16 Dec 1907 – Apr 1911) Died
Leonidas Medina † (23 Jan 1912 – 27 Mar 1916) Appointed, Auxiliary Bishop of Bogotá
Antonio María Pueyo de Val, C.M.F. † (26 Nov 1917 – 9 Oct 1929) Died
Hipólito Leopoldo Agudelo † (2 Sep 1930 – 23 May 1933) Died
Diego María Gómez Tamayo † (1 Feb 1934 – 22 Apr 1944) Appointed, Archbishop of Popayán
Emilio Botero González † (30 Aug 1947 – 21 Aug 1961) Died
Jorge Alberto Giraldo Restrepo, C.I.M. † (21 Nov 1961 – 1 Jul 1976) Died
Arturo Salazar Mejia, O.A.R. † (3 Jan 1977 – 2 Feb 1995) Resigned
Julio Enrique Prado Bolaños (2 Feb 1995 – 1 Oct 2020) Retired
Juan Carlos Cárdenas Toro (1 Oct 2020 – present)

Auxiliary bishops
José de Jesús Pimiento Rodríguez (1955–1959) Appointed, Bishop of Monteria; future Cardinal
Jorge Alberto Giraldo Restrepo, C.I.M. (1960-1961), appointed Bishop here

See also
Roman Catholicism in Colombia

Sources

External links
 GCatholic.org

Roman Catholic dioceses in Colombia
Roman Catholic Ecclesiastical Province of Popayán
Religious organizations established in 1859
Roman Catholic dioceses and prelatures established in the 19th century
1859 establishments in the Granadine Confederation